Petra is the first studio album by the Christian rock band of the same name. It was released in 1974.

The album features a style bordering between country and Southern rock somewhat similar to the Eagles or Lynyrd Skynyrd, which was the band's trademark during its first years.

The band's debut is more raw than later Petra albums, lacking the refined production values of future releases. It was recorded on a limited budget of $1,000 during the span of two weeks. Nevertheless, this first record displays remarkable guitar technique with many dual guitar solos reminiscent of the Allman Brothers, Wishbone Ash, Thin Lizzy, and other bands from the period who employed harmony leads.

Unlike later Petra albums, lead vocal duties are shared by guitarists Bob Hartman and Greg Hough.

Track listings 
All songs written by Bob Hartman, except where noted.

Vinyl
Side one
 "Walkin' in the Light" – 3:16
 "Mountains and Valleys" - 2:48
 "Lucas McGraw" - 3:24
 "Wake Up" (Greg Hough) – 3:40
 "Back Sliding Blues" – 4:29

Side two
 "Get Back to the Bible" – 2:23
 "Gonna Fly Away" – 4:55
 "I'm Not Ashamed" (Hough/Hartman) – 3:01
 "Storm Comin'" – 4:30
 "Parting Thought" – 1:31

CD

 "Wake Up" (Greg Hough) – 3:40
 "Get Back to the Bible" – 2:23
 "Gonna Fly Away" – 4:55
 "Storm Comin'" – 4:30
 "Parting Thought" – 1:31
 "Walkin' in the Light" – 3:16
 "Mountains and Valleys" - 2:48
 "Lucas McGraw" - 3:24
 "Backslidin' Blues" – 4:29
 "I'm Not Ashamed" (Hough) – 3:01

Personnel
 Bob Hartman - guitar, banjo, vocals
 Greg Hough - guitar, mandolin, vocals
 Bill Glover - drums, percussion
 John DeGroff - bass guitar
 Billy Ray Hearn - producer

Notes

1974 debut albums
Petra (band) albums